Chusovoy (masculine), Chusovaya (feminine), or Chusovoye (neuter) may refer to:
Chusovoy, a town in Perm Krai, Russia
Chusovaya, a river in Russia
Chusovaya (village), a village in Kurgan Oblast, Russia
R-14 Chusovaya, a Soviet theatre ballistic missile